Rimling (Lorraine Franconian: Rimlinge) is a commune in the Moselle department of the Grand Est administrative region in north-eastern France.

The village belongs to the Pays de Bitche.

See also
 Communes of the Moselle department

References

External links
 

Communes of Moselle (department)